The Interlaken Open was a golf tournament on the Challenge Tour, held in Switzerland.

History
It was first played in 1993 and replaced in 2000 by the Swiss Challenge, following financial issues.

Winners

Notes

References

External links
Coverage on the Challenge Tour's official site

Former Challenge Tour events
Golf tournaments in Switzerland
Summer events in Switzerland
Recurring sporting events established in 1993
1993 establishments in Switzerland
1998 disestablishments in Switzerland